Events from the year 1321 in Ireland.

Incumbent
Lord: Edward II

Events
 Roger Utlagh, Prior of the Order of St. John of Jerusalem, Kilmainham appointed Lord Chancellor of Ireland